The Kawasaki KAQ-1 was a small, radio controlled target drone aircraft manufactured by the Kawasaki Aerospace Company which was used by the armed forces of Japan and the United States to train fighter pilots and anti-aircraft gunners.

Purpose
The main purpose of the KAQ-1 drone was to train fighter pilots in the use of air-to-air missiles and to train anti-aircraft gunners on the ground. Alongside this the KAQ-1 was also used as a target in the testing of new weapon systems. 
The drone was used in this role throughout the 1950s by the armed forces of both Japan and the United States. When in US service, the KAQ-1 was mainly used by those units stationed in Japan.

Operational Use
In operation the KAQ-1 was launched from a ramp where after it was guided to a predetermined altitude and was them fired upon. If destroyed, a parachute rigged to the engine mounts would allow the drone's engine to be recovered and reused. When the KAQ-1 is not destroyed in operation, it is recovered via a parachute which is triggered by the drone operator or when the minimum allowable flight altitude is reached.

Operators
 : Japan Ground Self Defense Force
 : United States Armed Forces

Specifications (KAQ-1)

References

External links

Castle Air Museum website

Unmanned military aircraft of Japan
KAQ-1
Japan Ground Self-Defense Force
Japan Air Self-Defense Force